Goran Labus (born 28 April 1985) is a Serbian football goalkeeper.

References

External links
 
 Goran Labus stats at utakmica.rs 
 

1985 births
Living people
Footballers from Novi Sad
Association football goalkeepers
Serbian footballers
RFK Novi Sad 1921 players
FK BSK Borča players
FK Srem players
FK ČSK Čelarevo players
FK Spartak Subotica players
NK Zvijezda Gradačac players
OFK Bačka players
Serbian First League players
Serbian SuperLiga players